Berghia rissodominguezi is a species of sea slug, an aeolid nudibranch. It is a shell-less marine gastropod mollusc in the family Aeolidiidae.

Distribution
Originally described from Argentina, this species has also been recorded from the Brazilian and Caribbean coasts.

Description 
The maximum recorded length is 52 mm.

References

Aeolidiidae
Gastropods described in 1999